Gabriela Rodríguez may refer to:
 Gabriela Rodríguez (producer), Venezuelan film producer
 Gabriela Rodríguez de Bukele, first lady of El Salvador
 Gabriela Rodríguez (sport shooter), Mexican sport shooter